Market House, also known as The Market Hall and The D.L.& W. Hall, is a historic market building located at Oswego in Oswego County, New York.   It was built in 1835 and is a massive brick and stone structure overlooking the Oswego River.  The structure originally housed several government entities including city hall. A new city hall was constructed in 1870 and completed in 1872. A section of the basement is believed to have been used as a jail.  In 1864 the city sold it to the Oswego and Syracuse Railroad, that used it for the next 80 years as office and storage space.  The railroad upgraded the building with a bracketed cornice and elaborate cupola.

It was listed on the National Register of Historic Places in 1974.
The structure is privately owned, and a bar located on the north-most section of the first floor, named "Old City Hall" has been there for many years.

References

External links

Commercial buildings on the National Register of Historic Places in New York (state)
Historic American Buildings Survey in New York (state)
Federal architecture in New York (state)
Commercial buildings completed in 1835
Buildings and structures in Oswego County, New York
Oswego, New York
National Register of Historic Places in Oswego County, New York